The 13th edition of the FINA Men's Water Polo World Cup was held in the Alfréd Hajós Swimming Pool on Margitsziget (Margaret Island) in Budapest, Hungary, from 13 to 18 June 2006.

Teams

Squads

Goran Volarević
Damir Burić
Boris Pavlović
Srđan Antonijević
Tihomil Vranješ

Ratko Štritof (captain)
Andrija Komadina
Teo Đogaš
Andro Bušlje
Nikša Dobud

Aljosa Kunac
Miho Bošković
Miro Kačić
Head coach:
Ratko Rudić

Filippos Karampetsos
Anastasios Schizas
Dimitrios Mazis
Konstantinos Kokkinakis
Christos Afroudakis

Argyris Theodoropoulos
Nikitas Kocheilas
Georgios Ntoskas
Georgios Afroudakis (captain)
Andreas Miralis

Konstantinos Dimou
Manolis Mylonakis
Georgios Reppas
Head coach:
Alessandro Campagna

Zoltán Szécsi
Dániel Varga
Norbert Madaras
Ádám Steinmetz
Tamás Kásás (captain)

Márton Szivós
Gergely Kiss
Csaba Kiss
Rajmund Fodor
Péter Biros

Gábor Kiss
Tamás Molnár
Gábor Jászberényi
Head coach:
Dénes Kemény

Stefano Tempesti
Massimo Giacoppo
Valerio Rizzo
Fabrizio Buonocore
Andrea Scotti Galletta

Maurizio Felugo
Federico Mistrangelo
Fabio Bencivenga
Arnaldo Deserti
Alessandro Calcaterra (captain)

Luigi Di Costanzo
Goran Fiorentini
Fabio Violetti
Head coach:
Paolo Malara

Nenciu Berttini
Cosmin Radu
Florin Muşat
Florin Bonca
Andrei Iosep

Andrei Bușilă
Gheorghe Dunca
Ramiro Georgescu
Alexandru Ghiban
George Georgescu

Alexandru Matei Guiman
Kálmán Kádár
Robert Dinu
Head coach: 
Vlad Hagiu

Igor Shaltanov
Yuri Yatsev
Pavel Khalturin
Roman Dokuchaev
Roman Balashov

Anton Korotaev
Revaz Chomakhidze (captain)
Dmitri Stratan
Aleksey Agarkov
Marat Zakirov

Viktor Vishnyakov
Andrei Reketchinski
Yegor Rastorguev
Head coach:
Aleksandr Kabanov

Denis Šefik
Živko Gocić
Nikola Janović
Filip Filipović
Dejan Savić (captain)
Danilo Ikodinović

Slobodan Nikić
Vladimir Gojković
Aleksandar Ćirić
Aleksandar Šapić
Duško Pijetlović
Predrag Jokić

Zdravko Radić
Head coaches:
Nenad Manojlović
Petar Porobić
Nebojša Novoselac

Inaki Aguilar
Mario García
David Martín
Ricardo Perrone
Guillermo Molina

Sergi Mora
Óscar Rey
José Rodríguez
Xavier Vallès
Felipe Perrone

Iván Pérez (captain)
Xavier García
Ángel Andreo
Head coach:
Rafael Aguilar

Preliminary round
Tuesday 2005-06-13 

Wednesday 2005-06-14 

Thursday 2005-06-15

Standings

Olympic champions Hungary and reigning world champion Serbia & Montenegro won their groups after three wins in a row and went straight to the semifinals on Saturday.

Quarter finals
Friday 2005-06-16 
First quarterfinal (17:30h)

Second quarterfinal (19:00h)

Semi finals
Saturday 2005-06-17 
First semifinal (17:30h)

Second semifinal (19:00h)

Finals
Friday 2005-06-16 
7th/8th-place match (15:00h)

Saturday 2005-06-17 
5th/6th-place match (15:00h)

Sunday 2005-06-18 
Bronze Medal Match (15:30h)

Gold Medal Match (17:30h)

Top scorers

References

F
W
2006
International water polo competitions hosted by Hungary